Carlo Smuraglia (12 August 1923 – 30 May 2022) was an Italian politician and partisan who served as President of National Association of Italian Partisans from 2011 to 2017.

Biography

During the Resistance 
Smuraglia began studying Law in Pisa, when in 1943, with the Armistice of Cassibile, he left the University. He refused to join the Italian Social Republic and took part instead in the Italian resistance movement joining the "Cremona" Combat Group, with which he fought against nazi-fascists from Marche to Venice, until the Surrender of Caserta in 1945.

After the War 
Smuraglia returned to University and graduated at the Sant'Anna School of Advanced Studies and at the University of Pisa, beginning his political career as provincial councilor for Justice at the Province of Pisa.

He taught Labor Law in the University of Milan and the University of Pavia and was later elected regional councilor in Lombardy and appointed President of the Regional Assembly from 1978 to 1980.

From 1986 to 1990, Smuraglia has been a member of the High Council of the Judiciary, then led by President Francesco Cossiga.

From 1992 to 2001, Smuraglia has been elected to the Senate with the Democratic Party of the Left and was at the head of the Labour Committee of the Senate from 1994 to 2001.

President of ANPI 
From April 2011 to November 2017, Smuraglia was elected President of the National Association of Italian Partisans. In 2016, he said that ANPI would have supported "No" in occasion of the 2016 constitutional referendum proposed by Prime Minister Matteo Renzi.

Death 
Smuraglia died in Milan on 30 May 2022, at the age of 98.

Electoral history

References

External links 
Files about his parliamentary activities (in Italian): XI, XII, XIII legislature.

1923 births
2022 deaths
People from Ancona
Presidents of the regional council of Lombardy
Senators of Legislature XI of Italy
Senators of Legislature XII of Italy
Senators of Legislature XIII of Italy
Italian partisans
Italian Communist Party politicians
Democratic Party of the Left politicians
Democrats of the Left politicians
University of Pisa alumni
Sant'Anna School of Advanced Studies alumni
Academic staff of the University of Milan
Academic staff of the University of Pavia
Knights Grand Cross of the Order of Merit of the Italian Republic